Dubuque Senior High School (commonly Senior or DSHS) is a four-year public high school located in Dubuque, Iowa. It is one of two high schools in the Dubuque Community School District, and enrolls 1,447 students in grades 9–12. The school's mascot is the Ram; it competes at the state level in class 4A (which contains the state's largest schools) and is a member of the Mississippi Valley Athletic Conference.

History
Dubuque High School, the first high school in Dubuque, Iowa, was opened in 1858 on the third floor of a building on the southwest corner of Central Avenue and 12th Street (currently the site of the old Prescott Elementary School playground). The school enrolled 110 students and had a staff of two teachers and one principal. The institution was moved to a building at 17th and Iowa Streets in 1859 and then closed until 1866. Reasons given for the closure included the start of the Civil War, economic depression, and a feeling among the residents of Dubuque that an elementary education was sufficient.

In 1866 the high school was reopened. The district's administrative office was moved to the high school in 1872.

A complete high school course in the early years was three years in length. The first graduating class in 1870 had only two students, Sarah M. Belden and Mary O. Dorgan. Only 25 students graduated from the program between 1870 and 1876. The original teaching staff included the principal and up to three teachers.

By 1877 most courses were extended to four years. A four-year Latin program, scientific and classical programs, and a two-year business course were offered. From 1877 to 1885 the number of graduates soared to 219. In 1895, the two-year business program was discontinued and the high school became strictly a four-year program.

In 1893 the proposal to issue bonds in the amount of $75,000 to purchase a site and erect a new high school on the corner of 15th and Locust Streets was approved by Dubuque voters by a margin of 956 to 235. Central High School, as it was called then, was dedicated in 1895. Central High School was constructed of coarse-cut Wisconsin red sandstone with massive arches and a soaring clock tower. The interior of the building featured maple and oak woodwork.

At a special election held in 1920, voters approved the construction of a new high school to be located at the corner of Seminary Street (Clarke Drive) and West Locust, the present site of Dubuque Senior High School. The land, purchased from the Sisters of Charity, B.V.M., cost $45,335. Dubuque Senior High School was built at a cost of $766,179 and was formally dedicated on February 9, 1923. Enrollment the first year reached 733 students. Much of the stone used to build the current building was quarried from the site.

With the help of funding from the Works Progress Administration (WPA), a girls' gymnasium, lockers, dressing rooms, shower room, football practice field, and band room were added to the school between 1923 and 1940.

A technical building and a gymnasium were dedicated on November 12, 1954. In 1964 Dalzell Field was dedicated to Coach Wilbur Dalzell, who later in 1968 joined the Iowa Coaches Hall of Fame.   Additional classrooms and a library were added in 1965-1966 due to increasing enrollment. This three-story addition to the existing building created the enclosed courtyard.

The ever-increasing enrollment of the late 1960s brought the need for Dubuque's second high school. However, because of construction delays, the Stephen Hempstead Senior High School was not ready for classes on September 2, 1969.  As a temporary solution to this dilemma, all Dubuque Senior High classes were shortened, with Senior students attending classes in the morning and Hempstead taking over in the afternoon. By January 1970, Hempstead opened its doors for the second semester and everyone's class schedule returned to normal.

The James J. Nora Gymnasium was dedicated on December 3, 1988, recognition of James J. Nora's many years of loyal service as a teacher, coach, employee, community leader, humanitarian, and exemplary role model for the youth of the community.

In 1990, a $5.3-million building addition to Senior High added departmental learning centers, a cafeteria/commons area, a new library, computer labs, and additional classrooms. Today, the Dubuque Senior High School facility comprises  of space to support greater educational opportunities.

In 2006 renovations began on the Lamb-Hedeman Auditorium with a new lighting system that is to be completed in early 2007.  Further renovations are scheduled to begin in the summer of 2007, projects are expected to include the reopening of the balcony, new seating, a new stage floor, a new sound system and refurbishment of the house.  Additional projects such as new rigging, and new curtains are also part of the plan for the auditorium.

In 2013, a $10 million renovation to Dalzell Field was completed. The project included multi-tiered home-side bleachers, a turf-surface field and a new eight-lane track. Funds from the 1-cent sales tax fund paid for the upgrades.

Beginning in 2017, renovations began to  provide a new entrance and office area, a new library, a new cafeteria, a new gymnasium, and several new classrooms to the building.

Students
In the 2014–2015 school year, DSHS enrolled 1,619 students. Of those, 1,363 (84.2%) were White, 104 (6.4%) were Black, 46 (2.8%) students were Hispanic, 40 (2.5%) were Asian, 3 (0.2%) were American Indian and 63 (3.9%) were of two or more races.

Curriculum
In addition to the variety of standard high school/college prep. classes, Senior also offers a variety of Advanced Placement courses as well.  The AP subjects taught are Human Geography, World History, US History, English Language and Composition, Statistics, English Literature and Composition, Biology, Chemistry, Psychology, Computer Science A, Government, Economics, Calculus AB, and Calculus BC.  The Advanced Placement students that took the AP tests in 2006 earned Senior the 8th place in the state of Iowa for their scores.

Notable alumni
Jay Berwanger, football player, first winner of Heisman Trophy
Fred Gloden, NFL player
Joe Hoerner, Major League Baseball pitcher
Doron Jensen, co-founder of Timber Lodge Steakhouse and Old Country Buffet
Johnny Gaudreau, NHL player for Calgary Flames
Zemgus Girgensons, NHL player for Buffalo Sabres
Frederick Wilhelm Kaltenbach, radio broadcast propagandist for Nazi Germany, known for his "Letters to Iowa" broadcast from Berlin directed towards the American heartland
Brian Meyer, member of Iowa House of Representatives
Johnny Orr, Dubuque Senior men's basketball coach 1950s,  University of Michigan men's head basketball coach 1968-1980, and Iowa State University men's head basketball coach 1981-1994
Bob Stull, athletic director and football coach at University of Texas at El Paso, former head coach at Missouri
Landon Wilson, NHL player for Colorado Avalanche, Boston Bruins, Phoenix Coyotes and Dallas Stars.
Tom Preston-Werner, CEO of GitHub.

Principals
 Mr. D.M. Case 1858
 Dr. C.W. Catlin 1858–1859
 Mr. A.J. Townsend, 1858–1859
 Mr. J.M. Brainard 1866–1867
 Mr. W.H. Beach    1868–1875
 Mr. J.D. Wells    1876–1877
 Mr. Hiram L. Peet 1878–1885
 Mr. Frederick L. Parker 1886–1889
 Mr. David Compton 1890–1895
 Mr. E.D. Walker   1896–1899
 Mr. F.L. Smart    1900–1900
 Mr. G.S. Gochanauer 1901–1902
 Mr. F.L. Smart    1903–1906
 Mr. F.A. Anderson 1907–1914
 Mr. S.W. Ehrman   1915–1917
 Mr. Fred G. Stevenson 1918–1924
 Mr. M.S. Hallman  1925–1926
 Mr. Ralph W Johnson 1927–1944
 Mr. T. Eldon Jackson 1945–1947
 Mr. George W. Lee 1948–1965
 Dr. Roger A. Kampschroer 1966–1968
 Mr. David C. Darsee 1969–1971
 Mr. Donald H Kolsrud 1972–1986
 Mr. G. Larry Mitchell 1986–2005
 Ms. Kim Swift, 2005–2011
 Mr. Rick Colpitts 2011–2012
 Mr. Daniel Merritt 2013–2013
 Dr. Daniel "DJ" Johnson 2013–2022
 Mr. Brian Howes 2022-present

DSHS Athletics
Dubuque Senior competes in the state's Class 4A, and is a member of the Mississippi Valley Conference, one of the state's oldest and most successful conferences.  Senior has had a great deal of success at the conference and state levels over the years,  and has been known in the state for its strong women's teams.  Senior has won state championships in several sports, most recently winning the 2009 men's swimming state championship, the school's (and the city's) first swimming team title.

Girls 
Cross Country
Volleyball
 3-time State Champions (1973, 1980, 1983)
Basketball
Swimming
Track
Golf
 11-time State Champions (1958, 1959, 1960, 1961, 1962, 1963, 1965, 1991, 1992, 1998, 2000)
 1990 Coed State Champions
Soccer
Softball
 2-time State Champions (1974, 1985)
Tennis
Bowling

Boys 
Cross Country
 4-time State Champions (1925, 1987, 1995, 1998)
Football
Basketball
Swimming
 2009 State Champions
Wrestling
Track
 1937 State Champions
Golf
 1962 Class A State Champions
Soccer
Baseball
 1954 State Champions
Tennis
 1998 Class 2A State Champions
Bowling

Notable alumni

Jay Berwanger, first Heisman trophy winner while at the University of Chicago, played his prep football at Dubuque Senior. While at Senior, he was named to the Iowa all-state team and was a varsity letter winner.

DSHS Theatre
The Dubuque Senior Theatre Department has been very successful over its history. The past two retired theatre directors (Ms. Sybil Lamb and Ms. Francis Hedeman) have both been inducted into the Iowa Thespian Hall of Fame. In the past 7 years, the DSHS Speech team has won 7 banners at the IHSSA All-State Contest (1 solo mime, 4 ensemble acting, 1 readers theatre, 1 One Act Play). During the 2008-2009, Senior production of "Almost, Maine" was 1 of 7 main-stage shows around the world selected to perform at the International Thespian conference. At the 2010 Iowa State Thespian conference, Senior performed "Rabbit Hole" on the Main Stage, as well as winning awards for 1st and 2nd place in duet acting, and 2nd place in solo mime. Their performance of "Rabbit Hole" also was selected to perform on the main-stage at the International Thespian conference in 2011.

See also
Dubuque Community School District
Dubuque, Iowa
List of high schools in Iowa

References

External links
Dubuque Senior High School Website

Education in Dubuque, Iowa
Educational institutions established in 1923
Public high schools in Iowa
Works Progress Administration in Iowa
Schools in Dubuque County, Iowa
1923 establishments in Iowa